The Good luck knot can be seen in images carved on a statue of the Asian Goddess of Mercy, Guanyin, which was created between AD 557 and 588, and later found in a cave in northwest China.

See also
List of knots
Chinese knotting

External links 
 tying video

References 

Decorative knots
Knots